Macarena María Simari Birkner (born 22 November 1984) is a female skier from Argentina. She has represented Argentina in 2002, 2006, 2010 and the 2014 Winter Olympics, in the Alpine skiing events. She also took part in the 2005 Alpine Skiing World Cup, where she came 20th in the Women's Combined, and in the FIS Alpine World Ski Championships 2009. She is the sister of fellow alpine skiers Cristian Simari Birkner and María Belén Simari Birkner. She was in a relationship with British former alpine skier Noel Baxter, with whom she has a child. Simari Birkner, has set an impressive record having completed all the five Alpine Ski events in both 2010 and 2014 Winter Olympic Games. She shares this record with pluri-medalist Tina Maze.

Results

2001 Alpine Skiing World Cup:slalom; 312003 Alpine Skiing World Cupcombine;212005 Alpine Skiing World Cup:Combined– 20 26 slalom2006 Winter Olympics:Giant Slalom–31 Slalom–36Super-G–DNFCombined–26 FIS Alpine World Ski Championships 2009:Super Combined– 23Downhill– 30Giant Slalom– 372010 Winter Olympics:Downhill– 31Slalom– 37 & 36Giant Slalom– 51 & 45Super-G– 32Super Combined– 27 & 262011 Alpine Skiing World Cup:21 super combi; 31 Downhill; 34 slalom2014 Winter Olympics:Downhill– 32Slalom– 27Giant Slalom– 39Super-G– 26Super Combined– 20

References

External links

 
 
 
 

1984 births
Living people
Argentine female alpine skiers
Olympic alpine skiers of Argentina
Alpine skiers at the 2002 Winter Olympics
Alpine skiers at the 2006 Winter Olympics
Alpine skiers at the 2010 Winter Olympics
Alpine skiers at the 2014 Winter Olympics
Argentine people of German descent
Sportspeople from Bariloche